
William Field (June 1843 – 29 April 1935) was an Irish butcher from Dublin, and a nationalist politician. From 1892 to 1918 he was Member of Parliament (MP) for Dublin St Patrick's, taking his seat in the House of Commons of the United Kingdom of Great Britain and Ireland.

His father was a supporter of Young Ireland. Born at Blackrock, County Dublin, he was educated at Harcourt Street School, Dublin, and at the Catholic University, Dublin. He ran one of the biggest butchers' businesses in Dublin and was president of the National Meat Traders' Federation. He was also a member of Blackrock Urban District Council and Dublin Port and Docks Board.  J. J. Horgan described him in 1905 as "a venerable figure with a wide-brimmed hat and picturesque appearance reminiscent of Buffalo Bill". D.P. Moran's weekly paper The Leader often published caricatures of him in the 1912–18 period.

Field was politically active from the 1870s and had extensive connections in the labour movement and in 'Irish Ireland' organizations such as the Gaelic Athletic Association and Gaelic League. In the 1892 general election, standing for the Parnellite Irish National League, he took the St Patrick's seat in the Parnellite stronghold of Dublin from the sitting anti-Parnellite Irish National Federation MP William Martin Murphy by the wide margin of 3,991 votes to 1,110. Thereafter he retained this seat unopposed through five successive general elections, joining the United Irish League (sitting in the Irish Parliamentary Party) when the two factions reunited in 1900. At the 1918 general election he was defeated by Constance Markievicz of Sinn Féin by more than two to one.

He presented himself as a labour representative, though he denounced socialism; he attended early Irish trade union congresses as representative of the "Knights of the Plough" a farm laborers' body founded by Benjamin Pelin at Narraghmore, County Kildare in June 1892. Field then formed a break-away branch of the Irish Land and Labour Association, called the Land and Labour League designating himself as its President. He was essentially a "Labor nationalist" believing Irish workers and employers shared a common interest in developing Irish industry. The 1911 Census shows him living, unmarried, at 6 Main Street, Blackrock. The Nestor and Cyclops episodes of James Joyce's novel Ulysses contain passing references to a cattle traders' meeting addressed by Field, who expresses criticism of the quarantine imposed on Irish districts where cattle are suffering from foot and mouth disease.

Notes

Selected writings
 Distress in the West and South of Ireland, Dublin, M. H. Gill, 1898
 Irish Railways compared with State-owned and Managed Lines, Dublin, Irish Independent Printing and Publishing Co., 1898
 Irish Industry and Treasury Tactics, Dublin, J. Duffy & Co., 1909
 Town Tenants’ Texts, Dublin, John Falconer, 1915
 Housing Homily:  Dublin Domiciles, Dublin, Cahill & Co., 1916

Sources
 
 
 
 Who Was Who, 1929–1940

External links
 Contemporary debate by James Connolly
 
 

1848 births
1935 deaths
UK MPs 1892–1895
UK MPs 1895–1900
UK MPs 1900–1906
UK MPs 1906–1910
UK MPs 1910
UK MPs 1910–1918
Parnellite MPs
Irish Parliamentary Party MPs
Members of the Parliament of the United Kingdom for County Dublin constituencies (1801–1922)
People from Blackrock, Dublin
Local councillors in County Dublin